The Brisbane Indoor Sports Centre is a proposed sports venue to be built for basketball events at the 2032 Summer Olympics.  The venue is to be built within the newly developed Breakfast Creek Sports Precinct at Albion.

It is expected to have a seating capacity of 12,000.

See also

List of sports venues in Australia
Venues of the 2032 Summer Olympics and Paralympics

References

Venues of the 2032 Summer Olympics and Paralympics
Sports venues in Brisbane
Basketball venues in Australia
Buildings and structures in Brisbane
Albion, Queensland
Proposed indoor arenas
Proposed sports venues in Australia